The Webster County School District is a public school district based in Eupora, Mississippi (USA). The district's boundaries parallel that of Webster County.

Schools

High schools
Grades 7-12
East Webster High School (Cumberland)
Eupora High School (Eupora)

Elementary schools
Grades K-6
East Webster Elementary School (Mathiston)
Eupora Elementary School (Eupora)

Demographics

2006-07 school year
There were a total of 1,827 students enrolled in the Webster County School District during the 2006–2007 school year. The gender makeup of the district was 48% female and 52% male. The racial makeup of the district was 27.59% African American, 70.77% White, 1.20% Hispanic, 0.33% Asian, and 0.11% Native American. 44.1% of the district's students were eligible to receive free lunch.

Previous school years

Accountability statistics

Notable alumni
Johnthan Banks, NFL cornerback
Derrick Jones, NFL cornerback

See also
List of school districts in Mississippi

References

External links
 

Education in Webster County, Mississippi
School districts in Mississippi